Major-General Andrew Richard Evelyn De Cardonnel Stewart  (born 1952) is a former British Army officer who became General Officer Commanding Multi-National Division (South East), Iraq.

Military career
Educated at Felsted School, Stewart was commissioned into the 13th/18th Hussars in 1972. He became Commander of 7th Armoured Brigade in December 1996, Assistant Chief of Staff (Operations) at Permanent Joint Headquarters in Northwood November 1999 and Director of Military Assistance Overseas at the Ministry of Defence in December 2001. He was deployed as General Officer Commanding Multi-National Division (South East), Iraq in December 2003 and became Assistant Chief of the Defence Staff (Policy) in 2004. He retired in 2008.

References

1952 births
British Army generals
Companions of the Order of the Bath
Commanders of the Order of the British Empire
People educated at Felsted School
Living people
13th/18th Royal Hussars officers
Light Dragoons officers